Charles F. "Rusty" Goodman (September 2, 1933 – November 11, 1990) was an American singer/songwriter in the Southern Gospel Music industry. He was a prolific composer whose many songs included "Standing in the Presence of the King", "Leavin' On My Mind", "Home", "John the Revelator", "Touch the Hand of the Lord", "Had it Not Been" "I Believe He's Coming Back" "Look for Me" and "Who Am I?"  His songs have been covered by many of the top artists in the music industry including Elvis Presley, The Imperials, J. D. Sumner & The Stamps Quartet, The Speers, The Happy Goodman Family, Michael English and Gaither Vocal Band.

Goodman performed with The Plainsmen Quartet but he is better known with his family group, The Happy Goodman Family, where he sang along with his brothers Howard, Sam, Bobby and his sister-in-law Vestal Goodman.  He is also the father of Tanya Goodman Sykes, singer/songwriter and former member of The Goodmans and Heirloom.

Goodman launched his solo career in 1975 when Canaan Records founder Marvin Norcross approached him to record his first solo album. Goodman agreed and recorded The Singer.

He frequently performed both as a soloist and with his own group, "The Goodmans" on the popular Southern Gospel television series "Sing Out America".  In 1987, he joined host Bill Traylor and Kelly Nelon Thompson as the co-host of the series until his death. Rusty Goodman died of cancer on November 11, 1990. He was inducted into the Gospel Music Association Hall of Fame in 1993 and then inducted into the Southern Gospel Music Association Hall of Fame in 1997.

He did the bass singing part on the original "North to Alaska," which was recorded by Johnny Horton.

Awards and honors
 1971 Singing News Fan Awards - Favorite Male Singer
 1972 Singing News Fan Awards - Favorite Male Singer
 1972 Singing News Fan Awards - Favorite Baritone Singer
 1980 GMA Dove Award Rusty Goodman - You Make It Rain For Me (Cover Photo or Cover Art)
 1993 GMA Hall of Fame
 1997 SGMA Hall of Fame

Discography

See also
The Happy Goodman Family

References

 Rusty Goodman Album Cover Credits and Liner notes
 SGHistory.com page on Rusty Goodman Biography, History, Awards and Discography
 ASCAP Data Base list of Charles F Goodman Songs
 ASCAP Listing of artists who recorded the song "Who Am I"
 GMA Hall of Fame Year of 1993, lists Charles "Rusty" Goodman
 GMA Dove Awards - listed under Rusty Goodman
 SGMA Hall of Fame page about Rusty Goodman
 Resource Publications, "The Christian Music Directories" formerly "The Recording Locator"
 Goodman Ministries Official Website
 Happy Goodmans History and Discography with Art Work
 Canaan Records Discography
 Amazon listing about "Rusty Goodman - To The Homeland"
 Amazon listing on "Rusty Goodman - To Be Honest With You"
 New Haven Records Official Info on "Rusty Goodman - The Essential Collection"

External links
New Haven Records

Southern gospel performers
Songwriters from Alabama
People from Cullman County, Alabama
Singers from Alabama
1933 births
1990 deaths
20th-century American singers
20th-century American male singers
American male songwriters